Cold Case Files: Vol. 1 is a compilation album by American hardcore rap group Onyx released on August 19, 2008 by Iceman Music Group. This compilation contains singles and lost studio recordings from the group's albums.

The album was produced by Jam Master Jay, Fredro Starr, Kronic Tones, Dominche, Self and Keith Horne. The album features guest appearances from Method Man, X1 , Panama P.I., Smoothe Da Hustler, Trigger Tha Gambler, D.V. Alias Khrist, All City, Still Livin', Gang Green, Whosane and Chocolate.

Background 
After conquering Hollywood, Onyx return to the scene, emerging from their musical vaults with a new album, Cold Case Files, a 16-track collection of previously unreleased songs executive produced by the members of Onyx and Omar "Iceman" Sharif. The collection features underground singles, lost studio recordings from the group's first three albums, and appearances from Method Man, deceased Onyx affiliate X1, and Gang Green.  According to the group, revisiting these sessions also served as a tribute to fallen soldiers Jam Master Jay, X1, Big DS, and all Onyx affiliates who have passed away in the last five years; some of which are still unsolved murders.

Fredro's younger brother, Whosane, archived most of the unreleased tracks. Sonny Seeza, who served as album supervisor shares, "Whosane was usually in the studio with us and kept all our classic recordings that never made it onto albums in the Onyx music vault; so when the time came to select tracks for Cold Case Files, he had tracks that we didn't even know existed on everything from cassettes, DATs, CDs to 2-inch reels. According to Fredro Starr, Onyx has at least 60 tracks, and this is just the first volume of unheard material. DJ Infinite, one of Fredro's good friends, came up with the idea to make this album:"...We wanted to put something out for the fans, especially the true Onyx fans. DJ Infinite, one of my good friends and associates came up with the idea of doing this album and putting out some of these tracks. So my brother Whosane had the cassettes and the DATs saved from back in the days and we just transferred all that into the digital age and now you got the Cold Case album."

Critical response

RomanCooper of HipHopDX gave the album three stars out of five, saying "...This album is easily worth copping – if you’re an Onyx fan. If you’re not familiar with their music, you’d be much better served scooping up either Bacdafucup or All We Got Iz Us. Cold Case Files doesn’t really manage to distinguish itself from common issues associated with compilation albums. That being said, even cuts that didn’t make Onyx‘s albums manage to bring you back to the gritty early 1990s. With a gem or two nestled among these tracks, fans of that sound may want to check this."

Track listing

Personnel
Credits for Cold Case Files: Vol. 1 adapted from AllMusic and CD booklet.

 Onyx - performer, vocals
 Fredro Starr - performer, vocals, executive producer
 Sticky Fingaz - performer, vocals, executive producer
 Sonny Seeza - performer, vocals, executive producer
 Omar "Iceman" Sharif — executive producer
 Method Man — guest artist
 X1 — guest artist
 Panama P.I. — guest artist
 Smoothe Da Hustler — guest artist
 Trigger Tha Gambler — guest artist
 D.V. Alias Khrist — guest artist
 All City — guest artist
 Still Livin' — guest artist
 Gang Green — guest artist
 Whosane — guest artist
 Chocolate — guest artist
 Jam Master Jay — producer
 Kronic Tones  — producer
 Dominche — producer
 Self — producer
 Keith Horne — producer
 DJ Infinite — associate producer
 Salvatore "Dagrind" Mula — A&R
 David Rivera — A&R
 Dagrind Entertainment — A&R
 Whosane — album supervisor
 Inkpen — art direction, design

Cold Case Files: Vol. 2

Cold Case Files Vol. 2 is a compilation album by American hip hop group Onyx released on August 10, 2012 by Major Independents. Physical copies became available on January 23, 2014. The album contained unreleased tracks from the group's first three albums, Bacdafucup, All We Got Iz Us and Shut 'Em Down.

The album was produced by Keith Horne, Onyx, 8-Off Assassin, 3rd Eye (a.k.a. Jesse West) and Jam Master Jay. The album features guest appearances from Naughty By Nature, Biggie Smalls, 3rd Eye (a.k.a. Jesse West), Gang Green (X1, Sife, Still Livin'), All City (Greg Valentine), Jared "Choclatt" Crawford и Tracy "Sunshiine" Woodall.

Background 
One of the main findings of this collection was the never released before track "Flip Dat Shit". In January 1993, at the recording studio The Hit Factory in NYC, rappers Naughty By Nature, Onyx, Chyskillz, Jam Master Jay, Biggie Smalls, Puff Daddy and producer/rapper Jesse West (also known as 3rd Eye) joined together to record a track "Flip That Shit" special for the soundtrack to the new movie "Who's the Man?". Many years later, fans were still able to hear the track "Flip That Shit" thanks to DJ JS1, who passed this digitized tape to Sticky Fingaz, who added this track to the collection of unreleased songs of Onyx's "Cold Case Files Vol. 2"

The track "To All Ya'll Crews, Whatever", which was not included on the album "All We Got Iz Us", was leaked on Onyx's website in CD quality on March 22, 2016. Earlier, this track was released on Cold Case Files Vol. 2 in poorly digitized cassette quality.

Critical reception 

BOOM BAP REVIEWS gave this release a good response saying "The important thing is that Onyx actually took the bold step and we're here now with yet another Onyx collection that appealed. So, is it any good? The very nature of this project should be a godsend to Onyx fans. Plus, for the assholes out there, they're simply telling you to buy it for free. And besides, 6 crap songs out of 16 is still a bargain, right? Right?!".

Track listing

Notes:
 Information about samples was taken from WhoSampled.

Personnel
Credits for Cold Case Files: Vol. 2 adapted from CD booklet.

 Onyx - performer, vocals, producer
 Fredro Starr - performer, vocals
 Sticky Fingaz - performer, vocals, executive producer
 Sonny Seeza - performer, vocals
 Naughty By Nature — guest artist
 Biggie Smalls — guest artist
 3rd Eye (a.k.a. Jesse West) — guest artist
 Gang Green — guest artist
 X1 — guest artist
 Sife — guest artist
 Still Livin' — guest artist
 All City — guest artist
 Greg Valentine — guest artist
 Jared "Choclatt" Crawford — guest artist
 Tracy "Sunshiine" Woodall — guest artist
 Keith Horne — producer
 Jam Master Jay — producer
 8-Off Assassin — producer
 3rd Eye (a.k.a. Jesse West) — producer
 Paul Scavone — associate producer, album supervisor

References

External links 
 Cold Case Files: Vol. 1 at Discogs
 Cold Case Files: Vol. 1 at RapGenius
 Cold Case Files: Vol. 2 at Discogs
 Cold Case Files: Vol. 2 at RapGenius

Onyx (group) albums
2008 compilation albums
2012 compilation albums